The City Center Plaza is a skyscraper office building located in Taichung's 7th Redevelopment Zone, Xitun District, Taichung, Taiwan. As of December 2020, it is the 5th tallest building in Taichung and 23rd tallest in Taiwan.

See also 
 List of tallest buildings in Taiwan
 List of tallest buildings in Taichung
 Taichung's 7th Redevelopment Zone

References

2010 establishments in Taiwan
Skyscraper office buildings in Taichung
Office buildings completed in 2010
Taichung's 7th Redevelopment Zone